Midnight Mass is a Christmas Eve liturgical tradition in the Roman Catholic, Anglican, and Lutheran churches.

Midnight Mass may also refer to:

 Midnight, Mass., a Vertigo comics series
 Midnight Mass (EP), a 2010 EP by Acid Witch
 Midnight Mass, a 2004 novel by F. Paul Wilson
 Midnight Mass (short story collection), a collection by Paul Bowles
 Midnight Mass, a movie event series created by Peaches Christ in San Francisco, California
 Midnight Mass (miniseries), created by Mike Flanagan for Netflix
 "A Midnight Mass", a scene in the play Intimate Exchanges by Alan Ayckbourn

See also 
 Misa del Gallo, a version of the Midnight Mass in many Spanish-speaking countries
 Pasterka, a Midnight Mass celebrated in Poland